This article documents the events in motorsport that happened in the 1970s.

United States
The IMSA GT Championship begins in 1971
The Trans Am Series declines as the muscle car sees its demise after the Oil Crisis. It eventually adopts an IMSA GTO format.
The Can Am Series folds by mid decade due to the Oil Crisis and dominance of McLaren and Chevrolet. It is revived in 1977 based on Formula 5000, but folds shortly afterward.
Formula 5000 continues to be popular until mid-decade, when it declines into the basis for the new Can-Am
The Grand National becomes the Winston Cup Series after a purchase from Winston Cigarettes. Due to the Oil Crisis it is forced to allow even more modifications to its cars, beginning the departure from its strictly stock roots.
Championship Automobile Racing Teams is established, creating the first IndyCar Series.
The beginning of NASCAR legend Dale Earnhardt's long career.
Drag racing legend John Force debuts
short track legend Dick Trickle debuts, going on to win a record 1,200 races.
NASCAR legend Terry Labonte makes his debut
Mario Andretti won the Formula One drivers championship, the only American to do so thus far

South America
The Brazilian Grand Prix is first held.

Europe
The World Rally Championship is established
The BMW 3-Series is introduced
The Swedish Grand Prix debuts in 1973 and lasts for only six years.
Famous racing team Brumos Porsche is founded
F1 legend Niki Lauda makes his debut

Asia
The Japanese Grand Prix is first held.
The Datsun 240Z becomes successful in IMSA GT

See also
1960s in motorsport
1980s in motorsport